Finland was represented by Anneli Saaristo, with the song "La dolce vita", at the 1989 Eurovision Song Contest, which took place on 6 May in Lausanne, Switzerland.

Before Eurovision

National final 
The final was held on 6 May 1989 at the Kultturitalo in Helsinki, hosted by Tarja Koskela. Ten songs took part with the winner chosen by an "expert" jury. Other participants included former Finnish representatives Kirka (1984) and Sonja Lumme (1985).

At Eurovision 
On the night of the final Saaristo performed 14th in the running order, following Austria and preceding France. As the title suggests, "La dolce vita" was a song with strong Mediterranean influences and proved more appealing to international juries than most Finnish entries to this point. At the close of voting it had received 76 points, placing Finland 7th of the 22 entries, the country's highest placement of the 1980s and best finish since 1975. The Finnish jury awarded its 12 points to Denmark.

Voting

References

External links
 Full national final on Yle Elävä Arkisto

1989
Countries in the Eurovision Song Contest 1989
Eurovision